The EuroAsia Interconnector is a HVDC interconnector between the Greek, Cypriot, and Israeli power grids via the world's longest submarine power cable ( from Israel to Cyprus and  from Cyprus to Greece, for a total of ). Connecting Kofinou, Cyprus to Hadera, Israel and Korakias, Crete, Greece  the EuroAsia Interconnector is a major Project of Common Interest of the European Union and a priority Electricity Highway Interconnector Project, as an energy highway bridging Asia and Europe. Regulatory approval of electricity interconnection between Cyprus and Greece was completed on October 10, 2017. 

According to ENTSO-E's analysis, the interconnector will contribute to social and economic welfare between €580m and €1.12 billion in each year.

On May 12, 2017, the Greek Prime Minister Alexis Tsipras met the State Grid Corporation of China Chairman Shu Yinbiao in Beijing, and CEO Euroasia Interconnector Nasos Ktorides supported the timely implementation of EuroAsia Interconnector. On December 12, 2017 transmission system operator   Elia announced the conclusion of a strategic alliance agreement for the development and implementation of the 2,000 MW interconnector.

Greek Energy and Environment Minister Kostis Hatzidakis and Israeli Energy Minister Yuval Steinitz, during the 25th UN Climate Change Conference in Madrid (10 Dec. 2019), both reiterated their countries’ support in the Israel-Cyprus-Crete electricity interconnection project, the PCI 3.10 EuroAsia Interconnector.

Former Cyprus Foreign Minister and head of the European Parliament Foreign Affairs Working group Ioannis Kasoulides  joined the EuroAsia Interconnector on March 30, 2018, as Chairman of the Strategic Council.

Energy-sector technical engineering recruitment firm Fircroft included the EuroAsia Interconnector as the fourth biggest among 10 major transmission and distribution projects in the world for 2019 and beyond.

A final call for tenders for the construction of Stage 1 with an estimated budget of €2.5 billion was published on November, 2019 and in February 2021 in the Official Journal of the European Union.

On 8 March 2021, Cyprus, Greece and Israel signed an initial agreement to build the world's largest and deepest submarine power cable that will connect the three Mediterranean countries' power grids.

There are particular benefits for all countries involved since Interconnector will spur investment in renewables.

President of the European Commission Ursula von der Leyen visited Cyprus on 8. July 2021 and officially presented EU approval for Cyprus plan to spend €1.2 billion under EU Recovery and Resilience Plan.
EuroAsia Interconnector got €100 million   funding from EU Recovery and Resilience Plan.

On 26 January 2022, the European Commission approved €657 million under the Connecting Europe Facility (CEF) for Euroasia Interconnector.

The inauguration ceremony on the start of the construction works of Interconnector held on October 14, 2022 at the Presidential Palace in Nicosia. The ceremony was attended by European Commissioner for Energy Kadri Simson, President of Cyprus Nicos Anastasiades, Greek Energy Minister Kostas Skrekas, Cypriot Energy Minister Natasa Pilides and CEO Euroasia Interconnector Nasos Ktorides.

Energy in Cyprus, Greece and Israel

Energy in Cyprus

Cyprus as an island is totally isolated from EU energy links and electricity networks and remains the most energy dependent country in the European Union. Cyprus is completely isolated from EU energy interconnections. About 95% of the primary energy use was imported in 2015. Oil and petroleum products represent around 92% of the gross energy consumption.  Cyprus has no oil refineries. As a result of high import cost of petroleum products the price of electricity is one of the highest in the European Union.
Renewable energy share has reached 8% and according to national targets should reach 13% by 2020. Recently Cyprus announced discovery of the Aphrodite gas field with significant amounts of natural gas resources in its exclusive economic zone (EEZ), and additional gas prospects are being explored. Due to regional turmoil in the Eastern Mediterranean region and the fact that 1/3 of Cyprus is unlawfully occupied, for energy security it needs a reliable and robust energy infrastructure. EuroAsia Interconnector will connect Cyprus to the European electricity grid as the last EU member fully isolated from energy interconnections.

Energy in Israel

Israel's relationship with neighbors links politics and diplomacy with energy supply and security. Until recently domestic Israeli primary energy production was small. The country was dependent on imports of oil and coal, so that in 2012 only 13% of its energy balance was supplied from domestic resources. In 2010, the Leviathan gas field was discovered off the coast of Israel. This gas field represents a strategic change enabling Israel not only to be energy independent, but also to become an energy exporter, as the amount of gas discovered exceeds Israeli demands for at least 50 years. Unlike oil, gas is more difficult to ship and is not sold on spot markets, being priced uniquely for each deal. One reliable way for Israel to export natural gas could be in form of electricity using the Interconnector.

Energy in Greece
Greece's location at the crossroads of East and West and geographical connection to rest of Europe enables interconnection and energy flow from Eastern Mediterranean to Europe. Greece is a highly energy dependent country. Renewable energy share has reached 22%. Crete is an energy isolated island and it is the largest isolated power system in Greece. Like all isolated island systems the cost of electricity production is very high due to transportation costs of imported fuel and high operational costs of mainly outdated power generating units. Connected systems can have much lower costs of electricity by using electricity from distant power stations where electricity production costs are much lower. Crete is electrically isolated from mainland Greece and the Hellenic Republic subsidises the difference in the Crete electricity costs of around €300 million per year.

Eastern Mediterranean Hydrocarbon Findings 

The Levantine Sea  is bounded by Greece, Turkey, Syria, Lebanon, Israel, and Egypt. Cyprus is the largest island in the Levantine sea and it is located in the middle. Many countries in the region are in disputes with neighbors. 
The seafloor of the Eastern Mediterranean Basin is dotted with mud volcanoes which spew gas and occasionally oil into the benthic zone. Geologically it consists of sediment columns up to 12 km thick capped by evaporites. These geological and oceanographic facts led to speculation that Levantine sea contains big gas and oil deposits trapped in evaporites. Recently Eni discovered the Zohr gas field, largest known gas field in the Mediterranean. Also they estimated that there could be up to 1.7 billion barrels of recoverable oil.

Israeli and Cyprus gas fields 

Aphrodite gas field is Cyprus's offshore gas field at the exploratory drilling block 12 in the Cyprus maritime Exclusive Economic Zone. It is estimated that block 12 holds  of natural gas. Exploration is continuing in other blocks in the Cyprus EEZ. Calypso gas field in block 6 was found in 2018, and it is estimated that holds   of gas.

The first significant Israeli gas discovery was  the Mari-B field in 2000. Mari-B field produced gas until 2013 covering 40% of Israeli natural gas demand. Commercial production from Tamar field started in 2013. It covers nearly all industrial needs and gas from Tamar field generates over half of the country's electricity. In 2010, the Leviathan gas field was discovered off the coast of Israel.
natural gas.

Infrastructure 

It will have a capacity to transmit 2,000 megawatts of electricity in either direction.
The  cable will link Israel with Cyprus. The laying depth of cable will be up to  under sea level in some areas between Crete and Cyprus. It will be conducted in two stages.

In the first stage it will have 1000 MW capacity. It is expected to cost €2.5 billion in the first stage.  Interconnection between Hadera in Israel and Kofinou on Cyprus will be finished in December 2025. The longer interconnection between Kofinou on Cyprus and Korakias on Crete will be delivered in December 2025.

Configuration for Stage 1

The Interconnector provides important electricity highway in Southeastern EU and ends the electricity energy isolation of Cyprus and Crete interconnecting EU and Israel. The Interconnector's main components are:
3 converter stations in bipolar arrangements with multiterminal operation (in Greece(Crete), Cyprus and Israel). 
Subsea and land high-voltage direct current (HVDC) cables that will interconnect converter stations in Greece, Cyprus and Israel. Cables will run in pairs and each cable will be with power rating of 500 MW and voltage of 500kV.
Sea electrodes of 1000A and medium voltage direct current cables connecting them to converter stations
Alternating current (AC) switchgear connecting converter stations to the local electricity grid at four different locations

Pairs of cables will connect all converter stations. A converter station converts direct current (DC) to and from alternating current (AC). It can both send and receive power via the cable and to or from the grid. Converter stations are bipolar and could run bidirectionally enabling import or export of electricity depending on demand. Cables will run along bottom of the sea and on land will run underground.  Sea electrodes are used in case of cable or converter stations fault. Sea electrodes are placed at seabed several kilometers from shore and they are connected to converter stations. Converter stations will be of Voltage Source Converter (VSC) type. Each converter station will be rated to 1000 MW and made of two converter bridges of 500 MW.
Submarine power cables will be of extruded type.

Configuration for Stage 2
In stage 2 an additional 1000 MW converter station will be built in Crete and Israel and an additional 1000 MW bipole cable on the Israel-Cyprus—Greece route will be brought into service. Stage 2 will increase transfer capacity to 2000 MW.

Project of EU Common Interest 

The European Commission adopted on 14 October 2013 under Regulation (EU) No.  1391/2013 first list of key EU Projects of Common Interest. EuroAsia Interconnector is accepted as a cluster of three EU Projects of Common Interest important as trans-European energy infrastructure project. On 18 November 2015 the European Commission adopted second revised list of 195 EU Projects of Common Interest. EuroAsia Interconnector is included also on revised list. On 23 November 2017, Euroasia Interconnecter was included on third final list of EU Projects of Common Interest.
The European Commission issued the 4th PCI list on October 31, 2019, and the Euroasia Interconnector remains as PCI 3.10.

On 29 October 2014 the EU announced funding for 3 prestudies of the Interconnector project. These studies secured half of cost (€1,325,000) from the Connecting Europe Facility. On 17 February 2017, European Commission approved €14.5 million as financial support for final detailed studies prior to Project Implementation.

 EU covers half of cost of final detailed pre-works studies. The Interconnector was selected for funding as one of seven electricity projects. According to the EU Commission, the project contributes the Energy Union's goals by increasing security of energy supply, connecting European energy networks, and also contributes integration of renewable energy sources across the EU.

EU Priority Electricity Highway 
EuroAsia Interconnector has been labelled as a priority electricity corridor, and as priority Electricity Highway Project. On 23, November 2017, Euroasia Interconnector was on the third final list of EU Projects of Common Interest and has been labelled by the ENTSO-E as priority Electricity Highway Interconnector. Euroasia Interconnector was also on the fourth final list of EU Projects of Common Interest labelled as priority Electricity Highway Interconnector.

Big reduction of  emission 

European Network of Transmission System Operators for Electricity (ENTSO-E) assessed positively the Interconnector project based on cost-benefit analysis methodology. It is therefore included in the ten-year network development plan 2014 (TYNDP) and then also TYNDP 2016.
According to the cost-benefit analysis of ENTSO-E , the Interconnector will contribute to social and economic welfare between €580m and €1.12 billion in each year. The cost-benefit analysis is done using four different visions. Reduction of  emission is expected to be between 1.3 million tonnes and 6.8 million tonnes each year. For comparison Cyprus had  emission of 6.16 million tonnes during 2015. Therefore, reduction of  emission will be between 21% and 110% of total Cyprus  emission. Based on new assessments best estimate of reduction of  emission is expected to be 1.16 million tonnes for Stage 1.

Development of renewable energy sources on isolated systems like Cyprus and Crete could compromise islands electrical systems due to chaotic production fluctuations. Integration of renewable energy sources without interconnection is therefore limited. Electricity interconnection will enable and unlock integration of high percentage of renewable sources in such isolated systems.

History and development 

EuroAsia Interconnector project was announced by Nasos Ktorides in Nicosia on 23 January 2012, stressing the role of Cyprus as energy bridge between Europe and Asia. 
A cooperation agreement for conducting the feasibility study was signed in Jerusalem on 4 March 2012 between the project operator EuroAsia Interconnector Ltd.(previously DEI Quantum Energy), and the Israel Electric Corporation in the presence of Israeli minister for Energy and Water Resources Uzi Landau and Yiftah Ron-Tal, Director of the Israel Electric Corporation. On 23 March 2012, in Nicosia, the Electricity Authority of Cyprus signed a cooperation agreement with the project operator.
On 8 August 2013, the ministers of energy of Cyprus, Israel and Greece met in Cyprus. They signed the tripartite energy memorandum and reconfirmed their support for the Interconnector.

On 14 October 2013, the Interconnector was accepted as cluster of three EU Projects of Common Interest. Later it was also accepted on the second, third and fourth lists of key EU Projects of Common Interest.

In a meeting between the Israeli and Cypriot energy ministers in June 2015, the Israeli minister suggested doubling the planned capacity of the cable. With Israel and Cyprus both having located natural gas deposits within their territories, a higher capacity cable would allow them to construct gas-driven power plants and export significant amounts of electricity to Europe.

On 11 January 2016 in Nicosia Vice-President of the European Commission Maroš Šefčovič met with President of Cyprus Nicos Anastasiades and Minister of Energy Giorgos Lakkotrypis. They discussed huge potential of eastern Mediterranean for energy supply of Europe and pointed out EuroAsia Interconnector as a bridge and highway for energy supply.

Three pre-works phase studies were awarded on 18 December 2015 to the Italian companies CESI and G.A.S. S.r.l..The three studies are for the technical design, the reconnaissance study for the optimum route and an environmental impact study.
In January 2016, the Italian research ship Odin Finder started a reconnaissance study for the optimum route of the underwater cable. It took about 100 days to complete the survey. All three preworks studies were finished in 2016 and led to the next phase of the final pre-construction studies.

On 28 January 2016, the first Cyprus-Israel-Greece tripartite meeting took place in Nicosia.
During that meeting President of Cyprus Nicos Anastasiades, the Prime Minister of Greece Alexis Tsipras and the Prime Minister of Israel Benjamin Netanyahu affirmed their full support for the EuroAsia Interconnector. When they met again on December 8, 2016, in Jerusalem they reaffirmed their full support for the timely implementation of EuroAsia Interconnector.

On 17 February 2017, The European Commission approved €14.5 million as financial support for final detailed studies prior to Project Implementation.
On April 5, 2017 INEA signed the grant agreement to finalize the Interconnector's design by supporting final detailed pre-works studies.

On May 12, 2017, the Greek Prime Minister Alexis Tsipras 
met State Grid Corporation of China Chairman Shu Yinbiao in Beijing accompanied by Euroasia Interconnector CEO Nasos Ktorides 
and had discussions on jointly promoting of the Belt and Road Initiative and the strengthening of power and energy cooperation. Prime Minister Tsipras expressed his appreciation for the support Mr. Shu Yinbiao has given to the development of the Greek grid and the contribution made by State Grid Corporation of China  towards the timely implementation of EuroAsia Interconnector.

At a trilateral meeting of Prime Ministers of Greece Alexis Tsipras, Israel Benjamin Netanyahu and the President of Cyprus Nicos Anastasiades, in the Greek city of Thessaloniki on 15 June 2017.  they pointed out that EuroAsia Interconnector is strategically important for Greece, upgrading her status into a regional electricity and telecom hub.

The EuroAsia Interconnector cross border cost allocation was approved by the Energy Regulatory Authorities of Cyprus and Greece on 10 October 2017 and 21 March 2018. It is a historic decision for Cyprus, ending electricity isolation of the last EU member state.

Elia, Belgium's electricity transmission system operator, announced on 12 December 2017 that it had concluded a strategic alliance agreement with the EuroAsia Interconnector for the development and implementation of the 2,000 MW subsea electricity interconnector.

Former Cyprus Foreign Minister (1997—2003, 2013— March 2018) and head of the European Parliament Foreign Affairs Working group, Ioannis Kasoulides, joined EuroAsia Interconnector on 30 March 2018 as Chairman of the Strategic Council. On 11 September 2018, Dr. Kasoulides received the highest decoration awarded by France – Officer of the Order of the Legion of Honour.

In a speech at the public consultation held at the Hilton Cyprus on 2 April 2018, Cyprus Energy Minister Yiorgos Lakkotrypis described the project as of particular national geopolitical importance, as it enables Cyprus and Greece to act as bridges of cooperation, linking the eastern Mediterranean with the European Union.

On 8 May 2018, the fourth Cyprus-Israel-Greece tripartite meeting took place in Nicosia. Prime Ministers of Greece Alexis Tsipras, Israel Benjamin Netanyahu and the President of Cyprus Nicos Anastasiades reconfirmed their support to the timely implementation of EuroAsia Interconnector.

IPTO and EuroAsia Interconnector had a disagreement on the control of the link connecting Attica and Crete.
On 12 July 2018, IPTO and the EuroAsia Interconnector consortium failed to come to an agreement. 
Prior to the dissagrement IPTO insisted to the creation of a special moving vehicle (SPV) where IPTO would have a majority stake. Following this disagreement IPTO created a subsidiary with name Ariadne Interconnector responsible for the development of the Greek link to Crete.

The procurement stage of the project started on 13 February 2018 by notice for construction of Stage 1 with an estimated budget of €3.5 billion, published in the Official Journal of the European Union. 
A call for four tenders with estimated budget €3.27 billion was published on 17 April 2018 in the Official Journal of the European Union.

After a series of individual meetings with all successful converter station and cable manufacturers, EuroAsia Interconnector Ltd, as project promoter, has issued tender documents for contracts worth €3.5bn for the design and construction of the EuroAsia Interconnector.

A meeting between the European Commission and Cyprus authorities took place on February 27, 2019, in Nicosia. In a joint communique they have again shown full support for the timely implementation of EuroAsia Interconnector as a Project of Common Interest (PCI) and they recognised EuroAsia Interconnector as the official project promoter. 

On 6 June 2019, Giorgos Lakkotropis, the Minister of Energy,  signed on behalf of the Cyprus government a 33-year land concession agreement for construction of HVDC converter station.

On July 3, 2019, EuroAsia Interconnector Ltd, project promoter, announced the final stage of tenders for construction of the Euroasia Interconnector.

On October 11, 2019 Minister of Environment and Energy Kostis Hatzidakis on behalf of Government of Greece and Prime Minister said that Greece provides strong political support to the work of Cyprus's electrical interconnection with Greece and Israel as PCI projects, in order to lift Cyprus's electrical isolation and link the island to the European Union's electricity grids.

The Republic of Cyprus has issued in July 2020 final building permit for the construction of the HVDC converter station in Cyprus.

On 8 March 2021, Cyprus, Greece and Israel signed an initial agreement to build the world's largest and deepest submarine power cable that will connect the three Mediterranean countries' power grids to be completed by 2024.

President of the European Commission Ursula von der Leyen visited Cyprus on 8. July 2021 and officially presented EU approval for Cyprus plan to spend €1.2 billion under EU Recovery and Resilience Plan.
The EuroAsia Interconnector got €100 million   funding from EU Recovery and Resilience Plan.

On 26 January 2022, the European Commission approved €657 million under the Connecting Europe Facility (CEF) for Euroasia Interconnector.

The inauguration ceremony on the start of the construction works of Interconnector held on October 14, 2022 at the Presidential Palace in Nicosia. Ceremony was attended by European Commissioner for Energy Kadri Simson, President of Cyprus Nicos Anastasiades, Greek Energy Minister Kostas Skrekas, Cypriot Energy Minister Natasa Pilides and CEO Euroasia Interconnector Nasos Ktorides. Construction is scheduled to start this year and be completed in 2027.

Benefits of EuroAsia Interconnector

Ends energy isolation of Cyprus and connects them to the European network. Cyprus is the last member of EU isolated without energy interconnections.
Ensures secure energy supply of Cyprus and Israel connecting them with the European network
For new East Mediterranean gas finds enables path towards new markets in the form of electricity. Also enables a path for electricity produced from renewable energy sources.
Contributes to EU target for 10% of electricity interconnection between member states.
Promotes development of renewable energy sources and contributes to the reduction of 
Offers significant economic and geopolitical benefit to 3 countries. It is expected that socio-economic benefit will be around 10 billion €.

See also

EuroAfrica Interconnector
Submarine power cable
Elia System Operator
Nemo link
EastMed pipeline

References

External links
EuroAsia Interconnector – Official site

Electrical interconnectors to and from the Synchronous Grid of Continental Europe
Submarine power cables
Proposed electric power transmission systems
HVDC transmission lines
Electric power infrastructure in Israel
Electric power infrastructure in Cyprus
Electric power infrastructure in Greece
Cyprus–Israel relations
Cyprus–Greece relations
Greece–Israel relations
Proposed electric power infrastructure in Asia
Proposed electric power infrastructure in Europe